The Australia Council for the Arts, commonly known as the Australia Council, is the country's official arts council, serving as an arts funding and advisory body for the Government of Australia. The council was announced in 1967 as the Australian Council for the Arts, with the first members appointed the following year. It was made a statutory corporation by the passage of the Australia Council Act 1975.

The organisation has included several boards within its structure over the years, including more than one incarnation of a Visual Arts Board (VAB), in the 1970s–80s and in the early 2000s.

History 
Prime Minister Harold Holt announced the establishment of a national arts council in November 1967, modelled on similar bodies in Canada, the United Kingdom and the United States. It was one of his last major policy announcements prior to his death the following month. In June 1968, Holt's successor John Gorton announced the first ten members of the council, which was initially known as the Australian Council for the Arts. Economist H. C. Coombs became the first chairman of the body, while the other members included radio quizmaster Barry Jones, school principal Betty Archdale, magazine editor and state Liberal MP Peter Coleman, socialite Virginia Erwin (wife of federal Liberal MP Dudley Erwin), architect Karl Langer, author Geoffrey Dutton, theatre producer Jeana Bradley, arts patron Mary Houghton, and retired academic Kay Masterman.

The council issued its first grants in December 1968, which were distributed via the Australian Elizabethan Theatre Trust as the council did not yet have its own financial apparatus. Gorton stated that the council "had adopted a principle widely accepted [...] that high standards can best be achieved by a concentration of available funds, rather than by a thin spread over a wide area". The council subsequently received criticism from smaller professional and semi-professional companies, leading to the establishment of an Arts Special Projects Fund to assist smaller organisations. In December 1969, Coombs announced a new formula for grants whereby organisations could only receive a maximum of two-thirds of their budget from the council.

In February 1973, Prime Minister Gough Whitlam announced a new structure for the council whereby funding recommendations would be made by seven autonomous boards for different areas of the arts. Later that year, the council produced a report recommending that it be established as a statutory corporation.

Aboriginal Arts Board (1973)

The Aboriginal Arts Board (AAB) was created in 1973. Comprising Aboriginal Australian artists, writers and performers, its purpose was "to stimulate Indigenous Australian arts and lead to the preservation of many art forms almost lost since the settlement of Australia by Europeans". Dick Roughsey was the inaugural head of the board, followed by Yolngu artist and activist Wandjuk Marika. One of its earliest activities was the hosting of a seminar called Aboriginal Arts in Australia at the Australian National University, with around 800 attendees, with the intention of working out how government could best support Aboriginal culture and art in the future.

When created, AAB had similar aims as the Aboriginal Publications Foundation (APF), leading to some duplication of work by the two bodies. From mid-1975, promotional work carried out by the APF was put under the control of the AAB, while the APF became a referral body for the AAB. The APF was wound down, with its main responsibility the publication of the quarterly journal Identity until its closure in 1982.

The Australia Council became the biggest consumer of Aboriginal art, as there was not much interest in it during those years. Works were bought directly from artists, and often sent to galleries in the US and Canada.

The Board was later renamed the Aboriginal and Torres Strait Islander Arts Board or ATSIA Board, and is  the ATSIA Panel.

Change of name (1975)
After being given statutory authority in March 1975 by the Australia Council Act under the Whitlam government, it was renamed to Australia Council. The Council then incorporated other government projects, such as the Commonwealth Literary Fund and the Commonwealth Art Advisory Board.

The Visual Arts Board (VAB) existed during the 1970s and mid-1980s.

21st century
The Council's operations were independently reviewed in 2012, and the Australia Council Act 2013 (the Act) commenced on 1 July 2013.

In early 2014 federal Arts Minister George Brandis and Minister for Communications Malcolm Turnbull told artists at the Sydney Biennale that they were ungrateful and selfish to protest about the role of Transfield in the Nauru immigration detention centre. In December 2014, Brandis withdrew a large portion of literature funding from Australia Council.

In May 2015, Brandis cut $26 million a year for four years from Australia Council arts funding, a third of its arts funding, receiving significant criticism from the arts community. The money was reallocated to a new program, the National Program for Excellence in the Arts (NPEA). NPEA in turn was criticised by many artists and arts organisations for lacking the "arms-length" funding principles that had applied to the relationship between the government and Australia Council since its inception in the 1970s. These principles have traditionally had bipartisan support. Brandis was criticised previously for giving Melbourne classical music record label Melba Recordings a $275,000 grant outside of the usual funding and peer-assessment processes. Brandis's changes to funding arrangements, including the quarantining of the amount received by Australia's 28 major performing arts companies, were widely seen to disadvantage the small-to-medium arts sector and independent artists.

Following Malcolm Turnbull's successful spill of the leadership of the Liberal party in September 2015, Brandis was replaced as arts minister by Mitch Fifield. In November Fifield gave back $8 million a year for four years to Australia Council, changed the NPEA to the Catalyst Fund, and stressed it would have a focus on smaller arts projects. The arts community was not impressed by the changes.

As a result of the reduced funding, Australia Council cancelled project funding rounds for small groups and individuals in 2015 and then cut funding to over 60 arts organisations across the country in May 2016. Small arts organisations such as the Contemporary Art Centre of South Australia (CACSA), Leigh Warren & Dancers and many others were affected, forcing them to contract, merge or make drastic changes to their programs.

The Visual Arts/Craft Board was renamed the Visual Arts Board around 2007–8.

Function and governance
The Australia Council for the Arts is the Australian Government's principal arts funding and advisory body. Its purpose is to promote and invest in Australian arts. It is "accountable to the Australian Parliament, and to the Government through the Minister for the Arts".

Programs

Visual Arts and Crafts Strategy

The Visual Arts and Crafts Strategy (VACS), a partnership between the federal and all state and territory governments in Australia, was established in 2003, with the aim of "providing stability to Australia’s visual arts and craft sector". VACS delivers funding across all jurisdictions, with half provided by the Commonwealth and half by the states and territories. Its current policy framework runs from 2021 to 2024.

ACCELERATE 

ACCELERATE was a leadership program for Aboriginal and Torres Strait Islander people in the creative arts, run jointly by the British Council and Australia Council, in partnership with state arts agencies,  between 2009 and 2016. During that time, 35 people participated in the program, with many alumni going on to excel in their fields.

Awards

Australia Council Awards
The Australia Council Awards  were established in or before 1981, with the numbers of awards awarded each year growing over time.  there were eight categories for achievement in various types of arts, called:
 Australia Council Don Banks Music Award
Australia Council Lifetime Achievement in Literature
Australia Council Award for Dance
Australia Council Award for Visual Arts
Australia Council Award for Emerging and Experimental Arts
Australia Council Kirk Robson Award for Community Arts and Cultural Development
Australia Council Ros Bower Award for Community Arts and Cultural Development
 Australia Council Award for Theatre

Fellowships
Australia Council Fellowships, worth , "support creative activity and career development for mid-career and established artists". Past fellowship holders include: Hetti Perkins (2018), Lisa Maza (2017), Vicki Couzens (2016), Brenda L Croft (2015) and Reko Rennie (2015). They are awarded in the areas of Aboriginal and Torres Strait Islander arts; community arts and cultural development; dance; emerging and experimental arts; literature; music; theatre; and visual arts.

First Nations Arts Awards

The annual National Indigenous Arts Awards (NIAA) were established by the Australia Council in 2007. Renamed as the First Nations Arts Awards in 2020,   they include four categories, all restricted to Australian First Nations artists:
The Dreaming Award, established in 2012, "to support an inspirational young artist aged 18-26 years to create a major body of work through mentoring and partnerships", with Nakkiah Lui winning the inaugural award
The Red Ochre Award, established in 1993, a lifetime award for outstanding lifetime achievement in the arts, is awarded annually to both a male and female recipient
The First Nations Arts Fellowship, to support the creation of a major work
The First Nations Emerging Career Development Award, which supports two artists or arts workers to pursue their professional development

The awards ceremony is held event is held on 27 May each year, on the anniversary of the 1967 referendum. At the event, Indigenous Australians who have been awarded Fellowships (in 2018–2019, Vernon Ah Kee for visual art, and Ali Cobby Eckermann, for literature), and First Nations artists who received Australia Council Awards earlier in the year are also celebrated.

Controversy
In May 2020 the Australia Council awarded a  grant to performance artist Casey Jenkins for a piece titled Immaculate, incorporating a live stream of Jenkins  self-inseminating. Following adverse media coverage, the council suspended the funding hours before the first performance on 19 August, and formally rescinded the grant on 21 September 2020. The council stated that the withdrawal of the grant was not due to negative media coverage, but followed legal advice about the organisation's liabilities if pregnancy resulted. Jenkins said that the council had "grossly and insultingly mischaracterised my artwork". Writer and social commentator Ben Eltham wrote that the council's actions might have a chilling effect on performance art in Australia.

References

External links
 Australia Council for the Arts
 Culture and Recreation portal
 Australian Music Office - Australian Government organisation aimed at promoting export initiatives for Australian artists and music companies
 

Organizations established in 1968
Australia Council
Commonwealth Government agencies of Australia
Arts organisations based in Australia
1968 establishments in Australia